Darreh Tu Nem Nemi (also Romanized as Darreh Tū Nem Nemī; also known as Darreh Nem Nemī and Darreh Nemnemī) is a village in Abolfares Rural District, in the Central District of Ramhormoz County, Khuzestan Province, Iran. At the 2006 census, its population was 1,416, in 311 families.

References 

Populated places in Ramhormoz County